Tagirkent (Dargwa: ТӀагьиркент) is a rural locality (a selo) in Ebdalayansky Selsoviet, Levashinsky District, Republic of Dagestan, Russia. The population was 361 as of 2010. There are 10 streets.

Geography 
Tagirkent is located 10 km southeast of Levashi (the district's administrative centre) by road. Tagzirkent and Susakent are the nearest rural localities.

Nationalities 
Dargins live there.

References 

Rural localities in Levashinsky District